The Meseș Mountains are a mountain range in Transylvania, Romania, which belongs to the Apuseni Mountains.

The mountains are located in Sălaj and Cluj counties, south of Zalău and northwest of Cluj-Napoca. The main rivers flowing through the area are the Crasna (with its tributary, the Pria), Almaș, and Agrij.

Gallery

References

Bibliography 
Sălaj, Monografie, Victor Cormoș, Valentin Borda, Editura Sport Turism, București 1980.
Zona Etnografică Meseș, Ioan Augustin Goia, Editura Sport-Turism, București 1982.
Geografia României I. Geografia fizică, M. Ielenicz, Editura Universitară 2005

Mountain ranges of the Western Romanian Carpathians
Western Romanian Carpathians
Geography of Sălaj County